Grace Moon (1884–1947) was an American children's author, publishing many works on Native American themes. Her most notable work was Runaway Papoose, which won a Newbery Honor in 1929.

Biography
She was born Grace Purdie in Indianapolis. Moon received her education from the University of Wisconsin, National Academy of Design, New York and the Art Institute of Chicago. She spent several years in Europe and explored Aztec ruins in Mexico with her father. Her "bringing out" party was at the American Legation in Buenos Aires. In 1911 she married Carl Moon, a painter and photographer of the American Indian. Carl worked at El Tovar Studio in the Grand Canyon from 1911 until they moved to Pasadena in 1914. The couple had two children Francis-Maxwell and Mary. They collaborated on 22 children's books on the Pueblos and Navajos with Carl illustrating some of them.

Selected works
 Indian Legends in Rhyme - 1917
 Lost Indian Magic: A Mystery Story of the Red Man as He Lived Before the White Men Came – 1918
 Wongo and the Wise Old Crow - 1923
 Chi-Wee, The Adventures of a Little Indian Girl – 1925
 Chi-Wee and Loki of the Desert - 1926
 Nadita (Little Nothing) - 1927
 Runaway Papoose – 1928 
 The Magic Trail – 1929
 The Missing Katchina - 1930 
 The Arrow of Teemay - 1930 
 Far-away Desert - 1932
 Book of Nah-Wee - 1932
 Shanty Ann - 1935
 Singing Sands - 1936
 White Indian - 1937, "The story is well-paced and not too far-fetched."
 Solita -1938, "Grace Moon has established a reputation for this type of story, and though there is no particular distinction to this one, it is good routine story-adventure against a Mexican background."
 Daughter of Thunder - 1942, "All Moon books give accurate pictures of Navajo life, showing various customs such as the Rain Dance."
 One Little Indian - 1950

References

BibliographyIn Search of the Wild Indian: photographs and life works by Carl and Grace Moon'', Tom Driebe, Maurose Publishing, 1997

External links

 
 
Lost Indian Magic, full text and illustrations
Indian Legends in Rhyme, full text and illustrations

1884 births
1947 deaths
20th-century American novelists
American children's writers
American women novelists
Newbery Honor winners
20th-century American women writers